The Great Green Wall or Great Green Wall of the Sahara and the Sahel is a project led by the African Union, initially conceived as a way to combat desertification in the Sahel region and hold back expansion of the Sahara, by planting a wall of trees stretching across the entire Sahel. The modern green wall has since evolved into a program promoting water harvesting techniques, greenery protection and improving indigenous land use techniques, aimed at creating a mosaic of green and productive landscapes across North Africa.

The project is a response to the combined effect of natural resources degradation and drought in rural areas. It seeks to help communities mitigate and adapt to climate change as well as improve food security. The population of the Sahel is expected to double by 2039, emphasizing the importance of maintaining food production and environmental protection in the area.

History

In the 1950s the British explorer Richard St. Barbe Baker made an expedition in the Sahara. During St. Barbe's  expedition he proposed a "Green front" to act as a  tree buffer to contain the expanding desert. The idea re-emerged in 2002, at the special summit in N'Djamena, the capital of Chad on the occasion of World Day to Combat Desertification and Drought. It was approved by the Conference of Leaders and Heads of States members of the Community of Sahel-Saharan States during their seventh ordinary session held in Ouagadougou, the capital of Burkina Faso, on 1–2 June 2005. The African Union endorsed it in 2007 as the Great Green Wall for the Sahara and the Sahel Initiative (GGWSSI).

Lessons learnt from the Algerian Green Dam and the Green Wall of China led to an integrated multi-sectoral approach. Originally a tree planting initiative, the project evolved into a development programming tool. In 2007, CHSG directed the project to tackle the social, economic and environmental impacts of land degradation and desertification. The countries Burkina Faso, Djibouti, Eritrea, Ethiopia, Mali, Mauritania, Niger, Nigeria, Senegal, Sudan and Chad thereafter created the Panafrican Agency of the Great Green Wall (PAGGW).

A harmonised regional strategy was adopted in September 2012 by the African Ministerial Conference on Environment (AMCEN). According to AMCEN, the Great Green Wall is a flagship program that will contribute to the goal of the United Nations Conference on Sustainable Development, or RIO+20, of "a land degradation neutral world".

In 2014, the European Union and the United Nations Food and Agriculture Organization, in collaboration with African and other regional partners, launched the Action Against Desertification program to build on the GGWSSI. Nigeria created an interim agency to support GGW development.

Since 2014, the eco-friendly search engine Ecosia has been partnered with the local population in Burkina Faso. Ecosia spread its campaign to Ethiopia in 2017 and to Senegal the following year.

Drylands Monitoring Week (2015) assessed the state of dryland measurement and initiated collaboration toward large-scale, comprehensive monitoring.

Planning (including choices of vegetation and work with local populations) and plantings/land restoration followed (including in Ethiopia, Senegal, Nigeria and Sudan).

In 2016, 21 countries had projects related to the GGW, including farmer-supported natural regeneration.

Bare land restoration has been successfully demonstrated in Burkina Faso, although security is an issue in the face of terrorist activity.

In September 2017, the BBC reported that progress was best in Senegal.

As of March 2019, 15 per cent of the wall was complete with significant gains made in Nigeria, Senegal and Ethiopia. In Senegal, over 11 million trees had been planted. Nigeria has restored 4.9 million ha (12 million acres; 49,000 km2) of degraded land and Ethiopia has reclaimed 15 million ha (37 million acres; 150,000 km2). 
In September 2020, it was reported that the Great Green Wall had only covered 4% of the planned area, with only 4 million hectares (9.8 million acres) planted. Ethiopia has had the most success with 5.5 billion seedlings planted, but Chad has only planted 1.1 million. Doubt was raised over the survival rate of the 12 million trees planted in Senegal.

Partners

The Initiative brings together more than 20 countries, including Algeria, Burkina Faso, Benin, Chad, Cape Verde, Djibouti, Egypt, Ethiopia, Libya, Mali, Mauritania, Niger, Nigeria, Senegal, Somalia, Sudan, The Gambia and Tunisia.

Regional and international partners include:

 African Forest Forum (AFF) 
 African Union Commission (AUC)
 Association for the promotion of education and training abroad (APEFE)
 Arab Maghreb Union (UMA)
 Community of Sahel-Saharan States (CEN-SAD)
 Economic Community of West African States (ECOWAS) 
 European Union (EU)
 Food and Agriculture Organization of the United Nations (FAO)
 Global Mechanism of the United Nations Convention to Combat Desertification (GM-UNCCD)
 Intergovernmental Authority on Development in Eastern Africa (IGAD)
 MDG Center for West and Central Africa (MDG-WCA)
 Pan African Farmers Organization (PAFO)
 Panafrican Agency of the Great Green Wall (PAGGW)
 Permanent Interstate Committee for Drought Control in the Sahel (CILSS)
 Sahara and Sahel Observatory (OSS)
 Secretariat of the United Nations Convention to Combat Desertification (UNCCD-Secretariat)
 United Nations Development Programme–Drylands, Development Center (UNDP-DDC)
 United Nations Environment Programme (UNEP)
 United Nations Environment Programme–World Conservation Monitoring Center (UNEP-WCMC) 
 Walloon Region of Belgium, Wallonie-Bruxelles International
 World Agroforestry Centre (ICRAF)
 World Overview of Conservation Approaches and Technologies (WOCAT)
 The World Bank

Major principles
The project encompasses the Saharan strip, north and south borders, including Saharan oases and enclaves.

The GGWSSI intends to strengthen existing mechanisms (such as Comprehensive African Agricultural Development Program, Environmental Program (CAADP) of New Partnership for Africa's Development (NEPAD), regional, sub-regional, and national action programmes to combat desertification) to improve their efficiency through synergy and coordination activities.

The Regional Harmonised Strategy emphasizes partnerships between stakeholders, integration into existing programmes, sharing of lessons learnt (especially through South-South cooperation and technology transfer), local participation and ownership of actions and developing more integrated and global planning.

See also
 Three-North Shelter Forest Program, a Chinese anti-desertification program started in 1978
 The Great Green Wall of Aravalli, a 1,600 km long and 5 km wide green ecological corridor of India
 The Great Hedge of India, a historic inland customs border

References

Bibliography

External links

FAO page on the Great Green Wall
The African Great Green Wall project-What advice can scientists provide?  French Scientific Committee on Desertification (CSFD)
The Great Green Wall of Africa, BBC Newsnight
Great Green Wall - Africa For Africa, WorldPeaceLab
Planting in Syer, WorldPeaceLab

Desert greening
Desertification
Environment of Africa
Forestry in Africa
Forestry initiatives
Sahel